La Haye Sainte (named either after Jesus Christ's crown of thorns or a bramble hedge round a field nearby) is a walled farmhouse compound at the foot of an escarpment on the Charleroi-Brussels road in Belgium. It has changed very little since it played a crucial part in the Battle of Waterloo on 18 June 1815.

La Haye Sainte was defended by about 400 German troops during the Battle of Waterloo.  They were hopelessly outnumbered by attacking French troops but held out until the late afternoon when they retired because their ammunition had run out. If Napoleon Bonaparte's army had captured La Haye Sainte earlier in the day, almost certainly he would have broken through the allied centre and defeated the Duke of Wellington's army.

The capture of La Haye Sainte in the early evening then gave the French the advantage of a defensible position from which to launch a potentially decisive attack on the Allied centre. However, Napoleon was too late—by this time, Blücher and the Prussian army had arrived on the battlefield and the outnumbered French army was defeated.

Strategic importance

The road leads from La Belle Alliance, where Napoleon had his headquarters on the morning of the battle, through where the centre of the French front line was located, to a crossroads on the ridge which is at the top of the escarpment and then on to Brussels. The Duke of Wellington placed the majority of his forces on either side of the Brussels road behind the ridge on the Brussels side. This kept most of his forces out of sight of the French artillery.

During the night from the 17th to the 18th, the main door to the courtyard of the farm was used as firewood by the occupying troops. Therefore, when the King's German Legion (KGL) was stationed in the farm at the morning of the battle they had to hastily fortify La Haye Sainte.

The troops were the 2nd Light Battalion KGL commanded by Major Georg Baring, and part of the 1st Light Battalion KGL.  During the battle, they were supported by the 1/2 Nassau Regiment and the light company of the 5th Line Battalion KGL. The majority of these troops were armed with the Baker rifle with grooved barrels, as opposed to the normal Brown Bess musket of the British Army.  The French troops also used muskets which were quicker to load than the Baker rifle but the latter was more accurate and had about twice the range of a musket.

Both Napoleon and Wellington made crucial mistakes about La Haye Sainte as it was fought over and around during most of the day. Napoleon failed to allocate enough forces to take the farm earlier in the day while Wellington only realized the strategic value of the position when it was almost too late.

French attacks

At 13:00, the French Grand Battery of heavy artillery opened fire before d'Erlon's Corps (54th and 55th Ligne) marched forward in columns. The French managed to surround La Haye Sainte and despite taking heavy casualties from the garrison, they attacked the centre left of Wellington's line. As the centre began to give way and La Haye Sainte became vulnerable, Picton's division was sent to plug the gap. As the French were beaten back from La Haye Sainte, the heavy cavalry brigades under Somerset and Ponsonby attacked. This action relieved the pressure on the fortress farm.

At 15:00, Napoleon ordered Marshal Ney to capture La Haye Sainte. While Ney was engaged in the glorious but futile 8,000-man cavalry attack, unsupported by infantry or cannon, on Allied squares on the Brussels side of the ridge, he failed to take La Haye Sainte.

At 17:30, Napoleon re-issued orders for Ney to take La Haye Sainte.  The French had worked up close to the buildings by this time.

French capture and final assault

At 18:00 Marshal Ney, heavily supported by artillery and some cavalry, took personal command of an infantry regiment (13th Legere) and a company of engineers and captured La Haye Sainte with a furious assault. "The light battalion of the German Legion, which occupied it, had expended all its ammunition" and had to retreat.

Allied forces were unable to counterattack immediately as they were in squares over the ridge. The French brought up guns to fire from its cover. Riflemen of the 1/95 in the "sand pit" to the east of the farm picked off all the gunners, so the guns were ineffective.

At 19:00, thanks to the French garrison in La Haye Sainte, the Imperial Guard was able to climb the escarpment and attack the Allies on the Brussels side of the ridge. This final attack was beaten back and became a rout around 20:10 as the French forces realised that with the arrival of the Prussians from the east, they were beaten. During the French retreat, La Haye Sainte was recaptured by the Allies, some time before 21:00, when Blücher met Wellington at La Belle Alliance.

Modern La Haye Sainte
Today, La Haye Sainte is privately owned as a family home. On the walls are memorials to the KGL and the French. Opposite the house is a monument for the officers and the soldiers of the KGL.

See also
 List of Waterloo Battlefield locations

Notes

References

Further reading

Houses in Belgium
King's German Legion
Buildings and structures in Walloon Brabant
Waterloo Battlefield locations